William Woollett (15 August 173523 May 1785) was an English engraver operating in the 18th century.

Life
Woolett was born in Maidstone, of a family which came originally from the Netherlands.

He was apprenticed to John Tinney, an engraver in Fleet Street, London, and studied in the St Martin's Lane academy. His first important plate was from The Destruction of the Children of Niobe of Richard Wilson, published by Boydell in 1761, which was followed in 1763 by a companion engraving from the "Phaethon" of the same painter. After Benjamin West he engraved his fine plate of the "Battle of La Hogue" (1781), and "The Death of General Wolfe" (1776), which is usually considered Woollett's masterpiece. In 1775 he was appointed engraver-in-ordinary to George III; and he was a member of the Incorporated Society of Artists, of which for several years he acted as secretary.

Woollett's plates combined engraving, etching, and dry-point; and were considered highly esteemed examples of the English school of engraving.  Louis Fagan, in his Catalogue Raisonné of the Engraved Works of William Woollett (1885), enumerated 123 plates by Woollett.

Thomas Hearne became apprenticed to him in 1765, Woollett came to consider him the finest landscape engraver of his day; he stayed for six years.

Benjamin Thomas Pouncy (B.T. Pouncy) (died 1799), was a pupil.

He died in London; his is one of the many graves in Old St. Pancras Churchyard. He is not listed on the memorial to important lost graves erected in the 19th century.

Memorials
A monument to his memory, by Thomas Banks, stands in Westminster Abbey.

References

Further reading

Fagan, Louis. A catalogue raisonné of the engraved works of William Woollett (London, The Fine art society Ltd., 1885).
Bryan's dictionary of painters and engravers, volume 5 (New York: Macmillan, 1903) p394.
Brendan Cassidy, 'William Woollett's Ring', Print Quarterly, Vol.XXXV No.1 March 2018, pp70–71.

External links

William Woollett and family (woolletthistory.co.uk)
Engravings by Woolett (Government Art Collection)
William Woollett & William Hogarth – Frontispiece to Taylor's Perspective (Art of the Print)
Phaeton (engraving after Richard Wilson)
Works by Woolett (National Portrait gallery, London)

William Woollett (William Woollett at Geni)
 

1735 births
1785 deaths
English engravers
People from Maidstone
Burials at St Pancras Old Church